Cannabis in Brazil is illegal and criminalized, but possession and cultivation of personal amounts and for private use were de-penalized in 2006. Use of cannabis medications is allowed for terminally ill patients or those who have exhausted other treatment options. It is also possible to import, manufacture and sell cannabis-based medicines.

History
Cannabis was introduced to Brazil by the Portuguese colonists in the early 1800s. Their intent may have been to cultivate hemp fiber, but the slaves the Portuguese trafficked from Africa were familiar with cannabis and used it psychoactively, leading the Municipal Council of Rio de Janeiro in 1830 to prohibit bringing cannabis into the city, and punishing its use by any slave.

Medical cannabis
Since 2015, cannabis medications greater than 0.2% THC can be prescribed for terminally ill patients or those who have exhausted other treatment options. Initially these medications could only be imported with special authorization from Anvisa, but in 2019 the rules were relaxed to allow pharmacy sales. Products less than 0.2% THC can be prescribed with less restriction.

In January 2017 Brazil issued its first license for a cannabis-based medicine, allowing sales of Mevatyl oral spray (internationally known as Sativex).

In March 2020, the State of Pernambuco issued the first national license for the homemade planting of marijuana for medicinal purposes.

Enforcement
Since 2006, public use of cannabis entails a warning, community service and education on the effects of drug use. The same measures apply to public use of any illegal drug. However, there are reports of municipal guards applying extrajudicial punishment to civilian use of cannabis.

Selling, transportation, and trafficking of drugs are considered criminal acts and are punished with 5 to 15 years in prison and a significant fine.

References